Tarakan volcano is located in Indonesia's Halmahera islands, near the shore of Galela Bay north east of Dukono volcano. Tarakan consists of two large cinder cones, namely Tarakan Lamo (large Tarakan) and Tarakan Itji (small Tarakan).

References

Mountains of Indonesia
Volcanoes of Halmahera
Pyroclastic cones
Maluku Islands